Rensselaer William Foote (November 12, 1815 – June 26, 1862) was an American Army officer, a "Regular" from New York who served in the Seminole Wars in Florida, against the Sioux in the West, in Arizona and California and in the Civil War on the Virginia Peninsular Campaign.

Foote was born (prob.) at Delhi, New York to  Charles Augustus Foote (U.S. House of Representatives from Delhi) and Maria DeHart Baldwin.

Civil War
After a 24-year career of military service he died at Gaines' Mill, Virginia where he was buried on the field. There is a memorial marker in his family lot, Woodlawn Cemetery, Delhi New York.

Uniform and  Journal
Foote was an officer in the U.S. 6th Infantry, "Regulars" in the Seminole wars in 1841. After a term of service that included duty in Oklahoma, Arkansas and New Mexico territory, he died at the battle of Gaine's Mill. It was the first battle he participated in during the Civil War.

His letters, Journal kept in 1839–1842 mainly in Florida, and the uniform of Col. Foote are in the Collection of The Main Street Museum White River Jct. Vermont.

Excerpts from the Journal

References

Citations

Margaret Maxwell Marvin [Maynard], through Frances Maynard [Ford] pp., copies of Bible of other records of births and marriages. Collection Main Street Museum.

Katherine Adelia Foote, Ebenezer Foote, the Founder; Being an Epistolary Light on His Time as Shed by Letters From His Files; Selected by his Great Granddaughter... Delhi, 1927.

Foote Family Record, embroidered sampler showing the children of C. A. Foote, and Foote Family Bible Record, ms. The Main Street Museum, White River Junction, Vermont.
 

People of New York (state) in the American Civil War
1815 births
1862 deaths
United States Military Academy alumni
United States Army personnel of the Seminole Wars
Union Army officers
Union military personnel killed in the American Civil War
United States Army officers